Pseudocalotes guttalineatus, the dash-lined false garden lizard, is a species of agamid lizard. It is endemic to Indonesia.

References

Pseudocalotes
Reptiles of Indonesia
Reptiles described in 2014